Virginia Ferni Germano (16 December 1849 – 4 February 1934) was an Italian soprano opera singer.

Early life 

Virginia Ferni was born in Turin. Her mother was an actress, Francesca Ferni; her father was a cellist, Antonio Ferni; her siblings Angelo and Teresa were both musicians too. Virginia Ferni studied both violin and voice as a girl.

Career 

Virginia Ferni debuted on the opera stage in 1876, in Charles Gounod's Faust, at Madrid's Teatro Reale. She was the first to play Bizet's Carmen in Italian, at Milan's La Scala in 1885. She created the title role of Alfredo Catalani's Edmea when it premiered in 1896, and of Catalani's Loreley, when it was first performed in 1890. Arturo Toscanini made his professional conducting debut in Italy at an 1886 performance of Edmea starring Virginia Ferni Germano. Her 1886 appearance as Mignon in Milan prompted a London newspaper correspondent to comment that "her appearance is, to say the least, hardly suited for portraying a very youthful gipsy girl," but to concede that "her matured artistic abilities and fine voice sustain the part in a manner highly acceptable to her auditors."

After retiring from the stage she taught voice in Turin. Among her students were Alba Anzelotti, Bianca Lenzi, and Marisa Morel.

Personal life 
Virginia Ferni married Carlo Germano, a violinist. Their son Carlo (1880–1916) was also a violinist. Virginia Ferni Germano died in 1934, aged 84 years, in Turin. Her collection of autographed photos of other performers is archived in the Fondazione Giorgio Cini art collections.

References

External links 

 A painted portrait of Virginia Ferni Germano, by Rietti, in the Museo Teatrale (Scala) in Milan; at Getty Images.

1849 births
1934 deaths
Musicians from Turin
Italian operatic sopranos
19th-century Italian women opera singers